Zachary Thomas Moncrief (born January 8, 1971) is an American artist, producer, director, and writer in the animation industry. He's currently a co-executive producer on Netflix's pre-school series Ghee Happy. His titles have included supervising producer, writer, supervising director, storyboard artist, designer, and songwriter.  In 2009, an episode from Phineas and Ferb, which he directed entitled "The Monster of Phineas-n-Ferbenstein", received a Primetime Emmy Award nomination in the category for Outstanding Special Class Short-format Animated Programs.

Personal life
Moncrief left Montvale, New Jersey in 1989 after graduating from Pascack Hills High School where his father was the vice principal. Upon completion of high school, he decided to attend California Institute of the Arts, a Disney-funded college specializing in animation.

Career
Zac Moncrief's career began as an intern on the animated feature, The Pagemaster, and then moved on as an assistant animator on the film Cats Don't Dance. While there, he sold a pilot to Fred Seibert (then president of MTV Networks and Hanna-Barbera), for the What a Cartoon! series titled Godfrey and Zeek. This transitioned into doing story work for Hanna-Barbera's other series, Johnny Bravo.

Moncrief went on to open his own company, creating animation on several CD-ROMs, as well as a commercial work featuring Warner Bros.' Road Runner, the Carl's Jr. spot featuring Dennis Rodman, as well as animation for a GM-sponsored ride at Walt Disney World. Soon after, Moncrief joined Seibert again on a shorts program at Nickelodeon called Oh Yeah! Cartoons. There, Moncrief created Kitty the Hapless Cat, Baxter and Bananas, and worked on other shorts like The Fairly OddParents and the Emmy winning short Max and His Special Problem. He spent his remaining time at Nickelodeon storyboarding in season one ofDora the Explorer.

Shortly thereafter, he was asked to teach at his alma mater (CalArts) and by Walt Disney Television Animation to storyboard on Teacher's Pet, the series (and its theatrical release), as well as direct-to-videos for Lilo & Stitch, Kim Possible, and the network's newest show, Brandy and Mr. Whiskers.

Moncrief then went on as a Director on the Fox animated series Family Guy working on some of Seth MacFarlane's favorite episodes, such as "The Griffin Family History" and "Barely Legal".

He then followed fellow Family Guy director Dan Povenmire back to Disney again to help direct over 50+ episodes of the hit Disney television series Phineas and Ferb.

After his long run at Disney, he spent three years working at Bento Box as the Supervising Director on Comedy Central's hit show Brickleberry, while also helping to develop shows at Nickelodeon.

In December 2013, he joined Warner Bros. Animation to produce and revamp the twelfth series in the Scooby-Doo franchise, titled Be Cool, Scooby-Doo!, which debuted in the fall of 2015.

After producing close to 52 episodes and almost 2 seasons for Warner Bros., he then went back to Nickelodeon as a Supervising Producer in the fall of 2017 to help oversee and launch a cartoon series based on the hit Dan Schneider television show Henry Danger. This new animated series, titled The Adventures of Kid Danger, debuted on January 15, 2018, as a sneak peek, before its official premiere on January 19. The shows' ratings stayed consistently in the top 25, and on its final premiere episodes during the week of June 11–17, 2018, it was the #1 program for K6–11 (it received at 2.91 for boys aged 2–5 and a 3.15 for boys aged 6–11). The show is currently not slated for more episodes.

Moncrief then went on to be the Artistic Lead/Showrunner on the television adaption of the popular Lego augmented reality game app Hidden Side, with the title of Supervising Director. While working with Pure Imagination Studios, Moncrief created 19 different shorts for Lego, and launched off a 44-minute movie as a way to introduce its newest IP. The series premiered on YouTube to record numbers earning it a slot airing on Cartoon Network.

Moncrief is currently working with Sanjay Patel as Co-Executive Producer on Ghee Happy for Netflix Animation Studios. The show has yet to release its air date.

Highlights
 Phineas and Ferb 	      (2D - Kids and Family) 	• Director, writer and board artist on over 60+ episodes
 LEGO: HIDDEN SIDE 	  (3D - Kids and Family) 	• Creative lead directing artists and voice talent taking 20 episodes from script through post delivery
 Be Cool, Scooby- Doo!   (2D - Kids and Family) 	• Creative lead in the reimagining of legacy characters producing 52 episodes
 Brickleberry  		  (2D- Adult) 			    • Artistic lead to 1st time animation show creators for the first 2 seasons
 GHEE HAPPY 		      (3D - Pre-School) 		• Co-Ep involved in story, writing, song writing, and directing

Phineas and Ferb 
In 2007, Moncrief returned to Disney to work as a director and writer for Phineas and Ferb. As of December 2012, he had directed over 50 episodes in the series and been credited on over 90+ different credits.

Family Guy 
In 2005, Moncrief left Disney to become a director on the Fox television series Family Guy for Fox Animation Studios. He directed six episodes over a two-year span. Those six episodes were:
 "Peter's Got Woods", first aired on September 11, 2005
 "Brian Sings and Swings", first aired on January 8, 2006
 "Untitled Griffin Family History", first aired on May 14, 2006
 "Barely Legal", first aired on December 17, 2006
 "It Takes a Village Idiot, and I Married One", first aired on May 13, 2007
 "Peter's Daughter", first aired on November 25, 2007
 "Blind Ambition", first aired on May 15, 2005 (assistant director)
During this period, he also returned to CalArts as a teacher.

Credits
Note: Also credited as Zachary Moncrief.

Below is a detailed list of his credits:

 Turner Feature Animation: 

 The Pagemaster (1994) - Coordinator and animation intern
 Cats Don't Dance (1997) - Assistant animator

 Hanna-Barbera: 

 What a Cartoon!: Godfrey and Zeek short (also misspelled "Zeke") (1996) - Co-creator, co-writer, storyboard artist, and director
 What a Cartoon!: "Jungle Boy"  (short from Johnny Bravo) (1996) - Character layout and additional models
 Johnny Bravo (1996–1997) - Development and storyboard artist 
 Johnny Bravo: "Bearly Enough Time" (1997) - Storyboard artist 
 Johnny Bravo: "Cookie Crisis" (1997) - Storyboard artist 
 Johnny Bravo: "Blarney Buddies" (1997) - Storyboard artist

 Nickelodeon's Oh Yeah!  Cartoons:

 Kitty the Hapless Cat - Creator, director, designer, storyboard artist, writer 
 Baxter and Bananas - Creator, director, designer, storyboard artist, writer
 The Fairly OddParents: Story & Storyboard artist for two episodes
 Mina and the Count: "Playing a Hunch" (1999) - Storyboard artist 
 Max and His Special Problem - Animator
 Max and the Pigeon Incident -  Storyboard clean-up and character model assistance 
 Tales from the Goose Lady -  Storyboard clean-up and character model assistance

 Nickelodeon: 

 Dora the Explorer: Season 1 (2000–2001) - Storyboard artist 
 The Fairly OddParents: Seasons 2 and 3 - Storyboard revisionist
 My Life as a Teenage Robot - Storyboard Revisions and additional model designer   
 Woodstump - Supervising director, storyboard artist, co-writer
 The Adventures of Kid Danger (2017–2018) - Director and supervising producer

 Disney Television Animation: 
 Teacher's Pet - Storyboard artist
 Kim Possible: Season 1 - Storyboard revisionist
 Lilo & Stitch: The Series - additional storyboard artist and Storyboard revisionist
 Kim Possible: Season 2 - Storyboard artist 
 Lilo & Stitch 2: Stitch Has a Glitch - Storyboard artist
 Brandy & Mr. Whiskers - storyboard artist
 Phineas and Ferb - Director, storyboard supervisor, writer, storyboard artist

 Other Credits: 
 Fox Television Animation: Family Guy (2005–2007) - Director
 Comedy Central: Brickleberry - Director and supervising director
 Warner Bros. Animation: Be Cool, Scooby-Doo! (2015–2018) - Producer

References

External links
 Zac Moncrief Website
 
 Zac Moncrief on Blogspot

American animators
American animated film directors
American animated film producers
Living people
1971 births
California Institute of the Arts alumni
American storyboard artists
Pascack Hills High School alumni
People from Montvale, New Jersey
People from Spring Valley, New York
American people of Scottish descent